Province 7 (VII), also called the Province of the Southwest, is one of nine ecclesiastical provinces comprising the Episcopal Church in the United States of America. It comprises  eleven dioceses across the seven states of Arkansas, Kansas, Louisiana, Missouri, New Mexico, Oklahoma, and Texas. Sherry Denton of the Diocese of Western Kansas serves as President and Ed Konieczy of the Diocese of Oklahoma serves as Vice President.

Dioceses of Province VII

Diocese of Arkansas
Diocese of Dallas
Diocese of Kansas
Diocese of Northwest Texas
Diocese of Oklahoma
Diocese of the Rio Grande
Diocese of Texas
Diocese of West Missouri
Diocese of West Texas
Diocese of Western Kansas
Diocese of Western Louisiana

References and external links 
ECUSA Province Directory
Province VII website

Ecclesiastical provinces of the Episcopal Church in the United States of America